Nanshi District ( is a former district of Baoding, Hebei, China.  In May 2015, it was merged with Beishi District to form the new Lianchi District.

Administrative divisions
There were five subdistricts and four townships at the time of merging:
Subdistricts:
Lianmeng Subdistrict, Hongxing Subdistrict, Yuhua Subdistrict, Yonghua Subdistrict, Nanguan Subdistrict

Townships:
Nandayuan Township, Jiaozhuang Township, Yangzhuang Township, Wuyao Township

References

County-level divisions of Hebei
Lianchi District
Former districts of China
2015 disestablishments in China
History of Hebei